Meppen is a large, historic town in north Germany.

Meppen may also refer to:

Meppen, Coevorden, a small village in Drenthe, Netherlands
Meppen, Illinois, an unincorporated community in Illinois, U.S.